Scopula hypocallista is a moth of the  family Geometridae. It is found in southern Australia.

References

Moths described in 1900
hypocallista
Moths of Australia